The 2008 Humboldt State Lumberjacks football team represented Humboldt State University during the 2008 NCAA Division II football season. The Great Northwest Athletic Conference (GNAC) resumed sponsoring football as of the 2008 season, so Humboldt State no longer competed as an independent.

The 2008 Lumberjacks were led by first-year head coach Rob Smith. They played home games at the Redwood Bowl in Arcata, California. Humboldt State finished the season with a record of two wins and nine losses (2–9, 0–8 GNAC). Each team played the other conference teams twice during the season (home and away) instead of just once. The Lumberjacks were outscored by their opponents 170–357 for the 2008 season.

Schedule

Notes

References

Humboldt State
Humboldt State Lumberjacks football seasons
Humboldt State Lumberjacks football